Nelson Ned d'Ávila Pinto (2 March 1947 – 5 January 2014) was a Brazilian singer-songwriter. He built a solid career as a singer and composer of sentimental, suffering songs, rising to popularity in Brazil and Latin America in 1969 and becoming known internationally, especially in Portugal, France and Spain. In 1971 he released his first Spanish album, "Canción Popular" and performed in the US, Latin America, Europe, and Africa.

He was the first Latin artist to sell a million records in the U.S. with his hit "Happy Birthday My Darling" in 1974. He did instrumental work for the "Electric Moog Orchestra" in 1977. After his religious conversion in 1993, he only recorded Christian Evangelical songs in both Portuguese, Spanish and some in English.

Biography 

Nelson Ned d'Ávila Pinto was born in 1947 in Ubá, Minas Gerais, the eldest of seven siblings.

Ned married twice, and had three children with his second wife, María Aparecida.

Death 
Nelson Ned died at age 66 from pneumonia and cardiac arrest at Hospital Regional de Cotia, in São Paulo on 5 January 2014.

Discography

Studio albums 

 "Um Show em Noventa Centímetros" (Polydor – 1964)
 "Tudo Passará" (Copacabana – 1969)
 "Eu também sou Sentimental" (Copacabana – 1970)
 "Nelson Ned, Vol. 1" (Copacabana – 1970)
 "Nelson Ned, Vol. 2" (Copacabana – 1972)
 "Nelson Ned, Vol. 3" (Copacabana – 1973)
 "Aos Românticos do Mundo" (Copacabana – 1973)
 "Papai Noel Existe" (Copacabana – 1973)
 "Meu Ciúme" (Copacabana – 1975)
 "O Poder da Fé" (Celestial/Copacabana – 1976)
 "Nelson Ned" (Copacabana – 1977)
 "Meu Jeito de Amar" (Copacabana – 1979)
 "Perdidamente Apaixonado" (Harmony/CBS – 1982)
 "Caprichoso" (EMI-Odeon – 1984)
 "O Grande Nelson Ned" (Odeon – 1986)
 "Passei da Conta (EMI/Odeon – 1987)
 "O Poder da Fé Vol. 2" (Copacabana – 1990)
 "Enamorado" (RGE – 1991)
 "Penso em vocé" (RGE – 1992)
 "El Romantico de América" (Movieplay – 1993)

Christian repertoire

In Portuguese 
 Nelson Ned – O Poder da Fé Vol. 1
 Nelson Ned – O Poder da Fé Vol. 2 (Copacabana – 1990)
 Nelson Ned – Jesus Está Vivo DE SAHARIE
 Nelson Ned – Glórias A Jesus
 Nelson Ned – Jesus Está Voltando
 Nelson Ned – Jesus Te Ama
 Nelson Ned – Jesus É Vida
 Nelson Ned – Jesus Ressuscitou

In Spanish 
 Nelson Ned – Jesús Está Vivo (1993)
 Nelson Ned – Jesus Te Ama
 Nelson Ned – Jesucristo Es Vida
 Nelson Ned – Mi Testimonio
 Nelson Ned – Si las flores pudieran hablar

Compilations 
 O Melhor de Nelson Ned
 Nelson Ned – Dose Dupla
 Nelson Ned – Compoe e Canta Para Jesus
 Nelson Ned – Louvor e Adoração 2002
 Nelson Ned – 2 Em 1
 Nelson Ned – Warner 30 Años
 Seleçāo de Ouro (Movieplay – 1992)
 Seleçāo de Ouro – 20 sucessos (Copacabana/EMI Music – 1998)

Videos

VHS 
 Nelson Ned – Alabando al Rey (en español)
 Nelson Ned – Alabando Al Rey – Nelson y Otros (en español)
 Nelson Ned – Un Hombre Nuevo – A New Man (en español)
 Nelson Ned – Desde Brasil – Nelson Ned En Dallas (en español)

DVD 
 Nelson Ned – Un Hombre Nuevo – New Man (en español)

Books 
 Nelson Ned – O Melhor De Nelson Ned
 Nelson Ned – O Pequeno Gigante Da Cancao
 Nelson Ned – El Pequeño Gigante De La Canción

References

External links 

 Nelson Ned profile, allmusic.com; accessed 11 April 2014.
 "The Little Giant of Song"; accessed 11 April 2014.
 "Nelson Ned" profile, Cliquemusic.uol.com.br; accessed 11 April 2014.
 

1947 births
2014 deaths
20th-century Brazilian male singers
20th-century Brazilian singers
Entertainers with dwarfism
People from Ubá
Deaths from pneumonia in São Paulo (state)
Spanish-language singers of Brazil
English-language singers from Brazil
Brazilian male singer-songwriters